Her Boy is lost 1918 American silent film drama directed by George Irving and starring Effie Shannon and Niles Welch as her son. It was produced and distributed by the Metro Pictures company.

Cast
 Effie Shannon as Helen Morrison
 Niles Welch as David Morrison
 Pauline Curley as Virginia Gordon
 James T. Galloway as Colonel Danby Gordon
 Pat O'Malley as Charlie Turner
 William Bechtel as Oscar Schultz
 Charles Sutton as Dr. Swift
 Charles Riegel as Reverend Mr. Kimberly
 Violet Axzelle as Gretchen
 James Robert Chandler as Abner Turner
 Ferike Boros as Mrs. Schultz
 Anthony Byrd
 S. McAlpin
 J.C. Bates
 Edmund Wright

References

External links

1918 films
American silent feature films
Lost American films
Metro Pictures films
Silent American drama films
1918 drama films
American black-and-white films
1918 lost films
Lost drama films
Films directed by George Irving
1910s American films
1910s English-language films